Coptotriche tantalella is a moth of the  family Tischeriidae. It is found on the Canary Islands.

The wingspan is about 8 mm. The forewings are pale fawn-ochreous, sprinkled with yellowish. The hindwings are pale grey.

References

Moths described in 1908
Tischeriidae